National Secondary Route 170, or just Route 170 (or ) is a National Road Route of Costa Rica, located in the Alajuela, Guanacaste provinces.

Description
In Alajuela province the route covers Upala canton (San José district).

In Guanacaste province the route covers La Cruz canton (Santa Cecilia district).

References

Highways in Costa Rica